The US Highways in Michigan are the segments of the national United States Numbered Highway System that are owned and maintained by the state of Michigan, totaling . On a national level, the standards and numbering for the system are handled by the American Association of State Highway and Transportation Officials (AASHTO), while the highways in Michigan are maintained by the Michigan Department of Transportation (MDOT).

The original highways were approved on November 11, 1926, by AASHTO including 14 mainline highways. A handful of these original highway designations no longer run within Michigan, and a few numbers have been added since the 1930s. Since 1999, there have been 13 mainline highways, and with the creation of a business route for Constantine, there are a total of 30 special routes in the state. Several highways have been converted to freeways, some of which are now Interstate Highways and no longer part of the US Highway System. These freeway conversions started in the 1940s and 1950s and continued through to the turn of the 21st century.

Description
MDOT is the agency responsible for the day-to-day maintenance and operations of the State Trunkline Highway System, which includes the U.S. Highways in Michigan. The numbering for these highways is coordinated through AASHTO, an organization composed of the various state departments of transportation in the United States. Under the scheme finalized in 1926, two-digit US Highways are numbered in a grid; east–west highways have even numbers while north–south routes have odd numbers. The lowest numbers are in the east and the north. The east–west highways in Michigan number in the single digits up to the low 20s. The north–south highways range from the low 20s into the 40s. There are also three three-digit highways numbered in the 100s and one in the 200s as branches of related two-digit highways.

There are 13 mainline highways and 30 special routes in total, including one business route that is unsigned. Two of the mainline highways in the Upper Peninsula exit the state and re-enter, resulting in two discontinuous segments of highway for each in Michigan. The longest US Highway in the state is US Highway 23 (US 23) at just over  spanning from the Ohio state line north to the Straits of Mackinac in the Lower Peninsula, while the shortest is the  segment of US 8 south of Norway in Dickinson County. US 131 in Kalamazoo.

History

The US Highway System was approved on November 11, 1926. At the time, 14 mainline highways were designated in Michigan. Just two years later on November 12, 1928, US 102 was renumbered as part of an extended US 141, and the former designation was decommissioned. Since then, another four designations were added in the state during the 1930s. One of these, US 112S was a suffixed, directional branch of the US 112 mainline; it was removed
a few years after being designated in 1931. Around the same time period, the first alternate routes were designated, numbered with an "A" suffix.

During World War II, the Michigan State Highway Department (MSHD) built the Willow Run Expressway to carry workers from Detroit to the defense plants at Willow Run Airport. This expressway was numbered as a part of US 112 initially. During the 1950s, additional highways were converted to freeways before the coming of the Interstate Highway System in 1957. The first highway renumbered as an Interstate was US 24A in the southeastern corner of the state, which became part of Interstate 75 (I-75) in 1959.

Major numbering changes started in the 1960s as Michigan retired or rerouted its US Highways with the completion of Interstates. US 12 replaced US 112 in 1962 when the I-94 designation supplanted most of the original US 12. Later that year, US 16 was decommissioned in favor of I-96. This trend continued into the 1970s when US 25 was decommissioned as redundant to sections of I-75 and I-94.

Not all freeway conversions of existing US Highways resulted in the removal of US Highway numbers. In 1968, the state submitted a request for additional Interstate Highway mileage to the federal government, including a proposal to convert US 131. This specific project was not approved although the state continued its own efforts to convert the highway, including various segments opened in the 1970s and 1980s. Other highways converted to freeways included US 10, US 23, US 27, US 31 and US 127.

At the end of the 1970s, MDOT took part in a Federal Highway Administration-backed initiative called the Positive Guidance Demonstration Project, and the two agencies audited signage practices in the vicinity of the I-96/M-37 and I-296/US 131 interchange in Walker, north of Grand Rapids. MDOT determined that usage of the I-296 designation was "a potential source of confusion for motorists". Following this program, the Reflective Systems Unit at MDOT reviewed the state of two- and three-way concurrencies along the highway system in Michigan. They approached the department's Trunkline Numbering Committee and the district traffic and safety engineers on October 19, 1982, for proposals to reduce or eliminate the various overlapping designations to "avoid driver confusion and save funds". The initial discussion report included the various remaining overlaps between Interstate and US Highways. When the unit released its final recommendations on March 17, 1983, various changes were proposed. In 1983, US 2 was truncated, removing the overlap with I-75, and in 1986, US 10 was similarly shortened to remove an overlap with I-75. US 33 was all but eliminated in the state in 1986 as well, eliminating its overlap with US 31. Over a decade later, two highway designations were completely removed from the state in 1990s when US 33 and US 27 were truncated to end in Indiana in 1997 and 1999, respectively. The latter also removed an overlap with I-69.

Additional freeway sections opened around the turn of the 21st century. The St. Johns Bypass along then-US 27 opened on August 31, 1998; and bypasses of Cadillac and Manton on US 131 opened in 2001 and 2003. A  freeway segment of US 31 north from Berrien Springs to Napier Avenue also opened in 2003. Plans still had support to convert the expressway segment of US 127 between Ithaca and St. Johns into a full freeway as of 2009. MDOT completed a re-evaluation of the environmental studies for the conversion, but future activities were limited to right-of-way acquisition without any commitments for actual construction. Plans are also still in place to complete the rest of the US 31 freeway near Benton Harbor, but funding has not been available.

Mainline highways

Special routes

See also

Notes

References

Footnotes

Works cited

External links

Michigan Highways
Michigan Highway Ends

 
U.S. Highways